Cupriavidus pauculus is a Gram-negative, nonfermentative, motile bacterium of the genus Cupriavidus and family Burkholderiaceae isolated from water from ultrafiltration systems and bottled mineral water. C. pauculus is associated with human infections.

References

External links
Type strain of Cupriavidus pauculus at BacDive -  the Bacterial Diversity Metadatabase

Burkholderiaceae
Bacteria described in 2004